Mount Schaefer is a mountain (1,825 m) which marks the west extremity of Robinson Heights in the Admiralty Mountains. Mapped by United States Geological Survey (USGS) from surveys and U.S. Navy photography, 1960–63. Named by Advisory Committee on Antarctic Names (US-ACAN) for Paul W. Schaefer, United States Antarctic Research Program (USARP) biologist at McMurdo Station, 1966–67.

Mountains of Victoria Land
Pennell Coast